Millheim is a borough in Centre County, Pennsylvania, United States. It is part of the State College, Pennsylvania Metropolitan Statistical Area. The population was 904 at the 2010 census. The Millheim Historic District, which includes 176 contributing buildings, was listed on the National Register of Historic Places in 1986.

Geography
Millheim is located at  (40.890981, -77.475954).

The town was named for having a millhouse situated along Elk Creek; the town still features the mill's raceway, which flows through the downtown area.

Demographics

As of the census of 2010, there were 904 people, 377 households, and 251 families residing in the borough. The population density was 684.8 people per square mile (264.5/km²). There were 417 housing units at an average density of 315.9 per square mile (122.0/km²). The racial makeup of the borough was 98.2% White, 0.1% Black or African American, 0.1% Native American, 0.1% other, and 1.5% from two or more races.

There were 377 households, out of which 31.6% had children under the age of 18 living with them, 47.7% were married couples living together, 5.6% had a male householder with no wife present, 13.3% had a female householder with no husband present, and 33.4% were non-families. 28.4% of all households were made up of individuals, and 14.0% had someone living alone who was 65 years of age or older. The average household size was 2.40 and the average family size was 2.94.

In the borough the population was spread out, with 25.1% under the age of 18, 6.7% from 18 to 24, 24.6% from 25 to 44, 25.8% from 45 to 64, and 17.8% who were 65 years of age or older. The median age was 40 years. For every 100 females there were 92.8 males. For every 100 females age 18 and over, there were 82.0 males.

The median income for a household in the borough was $43,077, and the median income for a family was $48,029.  The per capita income for the borough was $17,335. About 9.9% of families and 10.7% of the population were below the poverty line, including 18.4% of those under age 18 and 3.8% of those age 65 or over.

References

External links

Millheim Borough official website

Populated places established in 1797
Boroughs in Centre County, Pennsylvania
1879 establishments in Pennsylvania